Stuart Lane (born 12 November 1952) is a former  international rugby union player. In 1980 he toured South Africa with the British and Irish Lions and at the time played club rugby for Cardiff RFC.

British and Irish Lions
Lane holds the unfortunate record of the shortest career of any Lions tourist, having been injured in the first minute of the opening game of the 1980 tour. This injury was a blow to the tourists as it was felt that the pace Lane could have provided in the breakaway positions would have been a strong asset for the Lions. He still lives in Tredegar and is part owner of Rhyd Hall.

References

1952 births
Living people
British & Irish Lions rugby union players from Wales
Cardiff RFC players
Newport RFC players
Rugby union flankers
Rugby union players from Tredegar
Wales international rugby union players
Welsh rugby union players